Gianni Lenoci (6 June 1963 – 30 September 2019) was an Italian jazz pianist and composer.

Life and career
Lenoci studied with pianists Paul Bley and Mal Waldron. A reviewer of his 1995 album Existence commented on Lenoci's "fascination with Paul Bley's scalar investigation – he rides his way through to the center of the melody in each case to find the improvising scale, and when he does, he creates arpeggios and skittering skeins of notes to cover it up while opening another door". Lenoci died on 30 September 2019.

Discography
An asterisk (*) indicates that the year is that of release.

As leader/co-leader

As sideman

References

1963 births
2019 deaths
Italian jazz pianists
Italian male pianists
21st-century pianists
21st-century Italian male musicians
Male jazz musicians
21st-century Italian musicians
20th-century pianists
20th-century Italian male musicians
20th-century Italian musicians
NoBusiness Records artists